The 2015 Huntingdonshire District Council election took place on 7 May 2015 to elect members of Huntingdonshire District Council in England. This was on the same day as other local elections.

Results Summary

Ward results

Brampton

Godmanchester

Huntingdon East

Huntingdon North

Little Paxton

Ramsey

Sawtry

Somersham

St Ives East

St Ives South

St Ives West

St Neots Eaton Ford

St Neots Eaton Socon

St Neots Eynesbury

The Hemingfords

Warboys and Bury

Yaxley and Farcet

By-elections between 2015 and 2016

Huntingdon East by-election
A by-election was held in Huntingdon East on 10 December 2015 after the resignation of UKIP councillor Andrew Hardy. The seat was gained for the Liberal Democrats by Ste Greenall.

References

2015 English local elections
May 2015 events in the United Kingdom
2015
2010s in Cambridgeshire